Dancing with the Stars is a Greek reality show airing on ANT1 and filming live in Athens. The show is based on the United Kingdom BBC Television series Strictly Come Dancing and is part of BBC Worldwide's Dancing with the Stars franchise. The theme song was "It's personal" performed by Swedish indie pop band The Radio Dept.

The third season of the show started on 18 November 2012. The judges were five, with Katia Dandoulaki joining the judging panel, replacing Errika Prezarakou and Galena Velikova returning on the judging panel.

Judges
Alexis Kostalas, announcer, sports commentator
Galena Velikova, choreographer, dancer, dance teacher
Katia Dandoulaki, actress
Giannis Latsios, ANT1 television program manager
Fokas Evagelinos, choreographer, dancer, dance teacher

Couples

Scoring chart

Red numbers indicate the lowest score for each week.
Green numbers indicate the highest score for each week.
 indicates the couple eliminated that week.
 indicates the returning couple that finished in the bottom two.
 indicates the winning couple.
 indicates the runner-up couple.
 indicates the third-place couple.
 indicates the couple didn't dance this week.

In episode 5 Vasia & Dimitris didn't dance due to Vasia's illness.
In episode 6 Vasia & Dimitris deducted two points on the scoring chart because they didn't dance on the previous show.

Averages 
This table only counts for dances scored on a traditional 50-points scale. The Dance Boogie Marathon points are not counted.

Highest and lowest scoring performances

Dance chart

  Highest Scoring Dance
  Lowest Scoring Dance
  Not performed due to illness
  Performed but not scored

Weekly scores
Individual judges scores in the chart below (given in parentheses) are listed in this order from left to right: Galena Velikova, Alexis Kostalas, Katia Dandoulaki, Giannis Latsios and Fokas Evaggelinos.

Week 1
Running order

Week 2
Running order

Week 3
Running order

Week 4
Running order

Week 5
Running order

Week 6
Running order

Week 7
Running order

Week 8
Running order

Week 9
Running order

Week 10
Running order

Week 11
Running order

Week 12
During the 11th week Zeta announced that the couples must include some ex-participants of Dancing with the Stars in their second choreography.

Running order

Week 13: Semi-final
Running order

Week 14: Final
Running order

Call-out order

  This couple came in first place with the judges.
  This couple came in last place with the judges.
  This couple came in last place with the judges and was eliminated.
  This couple was eliminated.
  The couple didn't dance this week.
  This couple won the competition.
  This couple came in second in the competition.
  This couple came in third in the competition.

Guest stars

References

External links
Official website of Dancing with the Stars Greece

Season 03
2012 Greek television seasons
2013 Greek television seasons